Nanaimo-Parksville was a provincial electoral district for the Legislative Assembly of British Columbia, Canada from 2001 to 2009.

Demographics

Geography

History

1999 redistribution
Nanaimo-Parksville created from parts of Nanaimo and Parksville-Qualicum electoral districts.

Member of Legislative Assembly 
It was represented by MLA, Ron Cantelon, a former city councillor for Nanaimo. He was elected in the 2005. He represented the British Columbia Liberal Party.

Election results 

|-

|-
 
|NDP
|Carol McNamee
|align="right"|11,854
|align="right"|38.67%
|align="right"|

|- bgcolor="white"
!align="left" colspan=3|Total
!align="right"|30,656
!align="right"|100.00%
!align="right"|
|}

|-

|-
 
|NDP
|Jamie Brennan
|align="right"|5,852
|align="right"|21.11%
|align="right"|
|align="right"|$11,643

|}

External links 
BC Stats Profile - 2001 (pdf)
Results of 2001 election (pdf)
2001 Expenditures (pdf)
Website of the Legislative Assembly of British Columbia

Former provincial electoral districts of British Columbia on Vancouver Island
Politics of Nanaimo